The province of Lorestan was a western province of Safavid Iran, corresponding to the present-day provinces of Ilam and Lorestan. It was one of the five velayats (semi-autonomous provinces) of the country, and was thus ruled by a vali ("viceroy", "governor").

History 
Lorestan was one of the five velayats of the Safavid realm, being ruled by a vali (viceroy), who was nearly an independent governor. The valis generally belonged to prominent local families, and were officially chosen by the shah as a compromise of regional autonomy. Nevertheless, they ruled in a hereditary manner.

The province was composed of three lower-ranking governorships, Khaveh, Sadmareh and Khorramabad, the latter which was also controlled by the vali of Lorestan. Since the closing of the 12th-century, Little Lorestan had been ruled by the Khorshidi dynasty. The area, also known as Lorestan from the 16th-century and onwards, roughly corresponded to the present-day Ilam and Lorestan provinces. In 1508, Lorestan acknowledged the suzerainty of the Safavid shah (king) Ismail I. After the latter's return from Baghdad, he confirmed the Khorshidi ruler Shah Rostam Abbasi as the governor of Lorestan, which included the districts of Sadmareh, Harunabad and Silakhur. During the 1540s, the Safavids established more direct control in Lorestan, such as in Khorramabad. Because the governor of Lorestan resided in the latter city, he was also known as the "governor of Khorramabad and Lorestan". From 1578 till 1587, the governors of Lorestan were in league with the Ottoman Empire.

Following the suppression of Shahverdi Abbasi's rebellion and his subsequent execution, Shah Abbas I had all male members of the Khorshidi family either blinded or jailed, thus marking their end. Shahverdi Abbasi's maternal cousin Hoseyn Khan ibn Mansur Beg Solvizi was appointed the governor of Lorestan, while Tahmaspqoli Khan Inanlu was appointed the governor of some of its parts close to Baghdad, such as Sadmareh and Hendamin. From 1603 and onwards, the Solvizi family became the hereditary governors of Lorestan. In the 1670s, however, Shah Soleyman gave the governorship of Lorestan to a non-Lori, who was later forced out by the locals.

List of governors 
This is a list of the known figures who governed Lorestan or parts of it. Hakem and beglerbeg were both administrative titles designating the governor.

References

Sources 
 
 
 
 
 
 

Lorestan
16th century in Iran
17th century in Iran
18th century in Iran
Lorestan
History of Lorestan Province